Arunachal University of Studies (AUS) is a state self-sponsored (top private university) established by Govt. of Arunachal Pradesh as a Multi-faculty Skill & Education University at Namsai, Arunachal Pradesh.

AUS is the extreme northeastern university of India and the first university to witness the sunrise in the country. The university is duly recognized by UGC u/s 2(f) and is empowered to award degrees specified u/s 22 of UGC Act 1956. AUS is a member of the Association of Indian Universities (AIU), New Delhi. The certifications issued by the university are globally accepted. AUS is the youngest university-level institution of India to be accredited by the National Assessment and Accreditation Council (NAAC).

Schools

Research 
Arunachal University of Studies also has research and doctoral programs under the Research and Development Center. The R&DC supports all sorts of research under various schools and also offers Doctor of Literature D.Litt. and Doctor of Science D.Sc. and Doctor of Law LLD

History
Since the foundation, the university has taken care of the holistic education through state-of-an-art intellectual and creative pedagogy.  AUS offers over 120+ professional programmed and tags itself as the state skill studies universities.

Campus 
The campus is situated at the serene location of Namsai district in Arunachal Pradesh, which is situated at a strategic location within in the proximity of 12 Districts Eastern Arunachal Pradesh, 16 Districts of Upper Assam and 4 Districts of Nagaland. Tribal population dominates the entire region and most of the students of AUS belonged to the minority and tribal groups. Being one of the very few higher educations.

Chancellor Kamal Lochan says:“Our endeavor is to propagate educational revolution by advancing fusion of knowledge, wisdom and intellectual refinement in our students.”Vice-Chancellor Prof. B. Mohankumar says:“The vision of a University as an inclusive community of scholars, international in character and a leader in higher education inspiring excellence and innovation, is the cornerstone of our strategy. As a community committed to the pursuit of knowledge, AUS would strive to provide student-centric education in a regional context and foster personal and intellectual growth to prepare students for productive careers, meaningful lives and responsible citizenship.”

Hostel 
Arunachal University of Studies has hostel for both girls and boys. The hostel is one of the finest accommodations in the state of Arunachal Pradesh. The campus is also home to the Rainbow Residency Series that holds there in campus accommodation to faculty staffs, and other managements. All residential services come with a mess functional three times a day with evening refreshments. Both vegetarian and non-vegetarian menu can be availed.

Library 
AUS has more than 2 lakhs and resource materials making it the largest resource center of the state. Enrolled students can freely access books, journals, and electronic journals from the library with a larger interest. The journal and stocks are updated every semester ensuring students’ get the best of the databases.

Other facilities 
Cafeteria, canteen, lounge, outdoor terrace, sports grounds are few of the other facilities offered in the campus. For the promotion of physical and mental health of the student in the campus, Sports facilities are offered. Both indoor and outdoor activities are advocated for character building. There are active volleyball, footballs, and other outdoor sports clubs.

Academics

Accreditation and Tie-ups

Organisation and Administration 
World Education Mission sponsors Arunachal University of Studies. Its headquarters is in Noida, Uttar Pradesh.President Dr. Ashwani Lochan says – “World Education Mission is a holy charitable trust that had the vision to offer skill-based education that is accessible to all. India being a vast ocean of cultural, regional, and linguistic diversity has a serious issue of accessible education. Arunachal Pradesh is one such place that requires a lot of educational grounds. Being a state filled with challenges, the Board of Management decided to let our course of action be implemented in the beautiful state. And thus, the establishment took its shape into what the country knows as Arunachal University of Studies has been listed as the best colleges in Arunachal Pradesh)."

Scholarship

Board of Governors & Board of Management

Notable alumni 

 Dr Chowna Mein
 Dr Kiren Rijiju
 Dr Mahendra Nath Pandey
 Dr Anshu Jamsenpa
 Prof Trilochan Mohapatra
 Dr Apurba Kumar Sharma
 Dr SK Srivastava

Committee 

 Research Committee
 Examination Committee
 Internal Complaints and Sexual harassment Committee
 Anti Discrimination Cell
 Anti Ragging Committee
 Planning Board
 Proctorial Committee
 Building and Work Committee
 Disciplinary Committee
 Finance Committee
 Gender Sensitization Cell
 Grievance Redressal Cell
 Academic Council

Awards 
 Arunachal University of Studies Best University in East India 2019 (CEGR)
 Arunachal University of Studies Best Knowledge Creation & Innovation University 2018 ASSOCHAM
 Arunachal University of Studies Best University in Academics -2017 CCLA
 Arunachal University of Studies Best Emerging University in North East -2017 ASSOCHAM

Mentor Panel and Visionaries 

 World Education Mission
 Chowna Mein

References

Universities in Arunachal Pradesh
Namsai district
Private universities in India